The men's doubles tennis event at the 2015 Summer Universiade was held from July 5 to 11 at the Jawol International Tennis Court in Gwangju, South Korea.

Joe Salisbury and Darren Walsh of Great Britain won the gold medal, defeating Chung Hyeon and Nam Ji-sung of South Korea in the final, 2–6, 6–3, [10–8]

Lee Hsin-han and Peng Hsien-yin of Chinese Taipei and Shintaro Imai and Kaito Uesugi of Japan won the bronze medals.

Seeds
All seeds receive a bye into the second round.

Draw

Finals

Top half

Section 1

Section 2

Bottom half

Section 3

Section 4

References
Main Draw

Tennis at the 2015 Summer Universiade